Urechinidae is a family of echinoderms belonging to the order Holasteroida.

Genera:
 Antrechinus Mooi & David, 1996
 Cystechinus A.Agassiz, 1879
 Pilematechinus A.Agassiz, 1904
 Urechinus A.Agassiz, 1879

References

 
Holasteroida
Echinoderm families